Julian Schmid (born 1 September 1999) is a German nordic combined skier.

Career

Early career
Schmid, who competes for SC Oberstdorf, was trained by Thomas Müller in his youth. Schmid completed his first international competition at the OPA Nordic Ski Games in 2014 in Gérardmer, France. He took fourth place in the Gundersen competition for students on the middle hill and over 4 km. In the years that followed, Schmid regularly competed in Alpine Cup competitions but rarely found himself in the top 20. In the junior competition of the 2016 OPA Games, Schmid also finished 16th. Together with Simon Hüttel, Niclas Heumann, and Tim Kopp, he won the silver medal in the team competition. At the beginning of the 2016-17 Alpine Cup season, Schmid finished eighth in Winterberg and was among the top ten for the first time. He finished third among the juniors at the German Nordic Combined Championships in 2016. In January 2017, he celebrated his Continental Cup debut but missed the points in both Otepää and Eisenerz, so he was demoted back to the Alpine Cup. Schmid scored his first points in the Continental Cup on 16 December 2017 in Steamboat Springs, Colorado. At the 2018 Nordic Junior World Ski Championships in Kandersteg, Schmid only competed in the team competition, where he finished in second place along with Kopp, Luis Lehnert, and Constantin Schnurr. The good results in the summer of 2018, in which he scored his first points in the Grand Prix, were followed by an equally good start to the 2018-19 Continental Cup season. After two podium finishes in Park City, Utah, Schmid was called to the senior national squad for the World Cup. On his debut in Otepää, he made it straight into the points with 26th place. At the 2019 Nordic Junior World Ski Championships in Lahti, Schmid was in top form and won the sprint competition. He also won the gold medal in the team event with Lehnert, Simon Hüttel and David Mach. In the 10 km individual event, he lost to Austrian Johannes Lamparter. In the two weeks that followed, Schmid was again part of the World Cup team, where he scored World Cup points on all three days of competition. At the Gundersen competition in Lahti on the Salpausselkä large hill and over 10 km, Schmid achieved his best World Cup result of the season with 15th place.

Move to the World Cup
In May, when the DSV published their squad classification for the coming season, Schmid announced that he had been promoted to course level 1a and was therefore nominated for the national squad. He was already able to live up to this vote of confidence in the 2019 Grand Prix. Schmid completed numerous competitions, including sixth place in Oberhof in early September. He followed this performance at the German Championships in Klingenthal and Johanngeorgenstadt. While he narrowly missed the podium in the individual, he won his first medal at the senior level with Johannes Rydzek in third place in the team sprint. As the reigning Junior World Champion, Schmid secured a place in the World Cup team at the start of the winter in Rukatunturi. After initially just missing out on the points, he showed his potential with ranks 14 and 16. With further good performances in Lillehammer, he consolidated his position in the German World Cup team, although his mileage still had room for improvement. He finished the season in 32nd place in the overall World Cup rankings. Since no international competitions took place in the summer of 2020 due to the COVID-19 pandemic, the German championships in October in Oberstdorf were the first events Schmid competed in that year. In the individual event, he showed balanced performances in jumping and cross-country skiing and finally finished ninth before finishing fourth in the team sprint the following day together with Wendelin Thannheimer. At the start of the 2020–21 season, Schmid traveled to Ruka as a reserve athlete with the German World Cup team but was not deployed there. He, therefore, completed his first competitions on the second weekend in December as part of the Continental Cup in Park City, where three competitions were pending. In the first Gundersen race, he was able to make up the deficit of more than a minute after the jump and catch up with the leading group, but he lost a few places on the last lap and finally finished seventh. On the second day of the competition, he put himself in a promising position in the mass start after cross-country skiing, which he exploited the following day with the second-best jumping performance and was able to celebrate his first Continental Cup victory. The third competition was again held using the Gundersen method, but Schmid managed to remain part of the leading group until the end. After a successful sprint against Jakob Lange, he finally achieved his second victory. He was then honored by the FIS as Athlete of the Week. The following weekend, Schmid was again part of the German World Cup team in Ramsau and finished in the points on both days of the competition. In mid-January 2021, Schmid finished fourth in the team sprint in Val di Fiemme along with Rydzek after losing to the Finnish team.

On 25 November 2022, Schmid claimed his maiden World Cup victory in the opening event of the 2022–23 season, in Ruka. His second win came in the same season, in Otepää, in January 2023.

Record

Olympic Games

World Championship

World Cup

Standings

Individual victories

References

External links

1999 births
Living people
German male Nordic combined skiers
Olympic Nordic combined skiers of Germany
Nordic combined skiers at the 2022 Winter Olympics
People from Oberstdorf
Sportspeople from Swabia (Bavaria)
Olympic silver medalists for Germany
Olympic medalists in Nordic combined
Medalists at the 2022 Winter Olympics
FIS Nordic World Ski Championships medalists in Nordic combined